The Sartell Bridge is a bridge that spans the Mississippi River in the city of Sartell in the U.S. state of Minnesota.  The bridge also spans a roadway, property belonging to the Sartell paper mill, and a rail line on the east side of the river.

See also
List of crossings of the Upper Mississippi River

References
 

Sartell, Minnesota
Road bridges in Minnesota
Bridges over the Mississippi River
Bridges completed in 1984
Buildings and structures in Benton County, Minnesota
Buildings and structures in Stearns County, Minnesota
Transportation in Benton County, Minnesota
Transportation in Stearns County, Minnesota
Great River Road
Concrete bridges in the United States
Girder bridges in the United States